This is a list of American films released in 1989.
Driving Miss Daisy won the Academy Award for Best Picture.

Highest-grossing films
 Batman – directed by Tim Burton, starring Michael Keaton, Jack Nicholson and Kim Basinger
 Indiana Jones and the Last Crusade – starring Harrison Ford and Sean Connery
 Lethal Weapon 2 – starring Mel Gibson and Danny Glover
 Look Who's Talking – starring Kirstie Alley, John Travolta, Olympia Dukakis
 Honey, I Shrunk the Kids – starring Rick Moranis
 Back to the Future Part II – starring Michael J. Fox, Christopher Lloyd and Lea Thompson
 Ghostbusters II – starring Bill Murray, Dan Aykroyd, Sigourney Weaver, Harold Ramis, Ernie Hudson and Rick Moranis
 Driving Miss Daisy – starring Jessica Tandy, Morgan Freeman and Dan Aykroyd
 Parenthood – starring Steve Martin, Mary Steenburgen, Jason Robards, Dianne Wiest, Rick Moranis, Tom Hulce, Martha Plimpton and Keanu Reeves
 Dead Poets Society – starring Robin Williams and Ethan Hawke

A

B-C

D-G

H-K

L-M

N-Q

R-S

T-Z

See also
 1989 in American television
 1989 in the United States

References

External links

 
 List of 1989 box office number-one films in the United States

1989
Films
Lists of 1989 films by country or language